Madingo-Kayes is a district in the Kouilou Region of far south-western Republic of the Congo. The capital lies at Madingo-Kayes.

The area is known for its archaeological site Madingo Kayes.

Towns and villages

Kouilou Department
Districts of the Republic of the Congo